Echálaz is a locality located in the municipality of Valle de Egüés, in Navarre province, Spain, Spain. As of 2020, it has a population of 4.

Geography 
Echálaz is located 13km east-northeast of Pamplona.

References

Populated places in Navarre